The Sri Lanka Air Force 25th Anniversary Medal (Sinhala: ශ්‍රී ලංකා ගුවන් හමුදා 25වන සංවත්සර පදක්කම  Śrī Laṃkā guwan hamudā visipasvana sangwathsara padakkama) was awarded to all ranks of both the regular- and volunteer forces of the Sri Lanka Air Force, as well as civilians employed within the SLAF who were in service on the 2 March 1976, the date of the 25th anniversary of the SLAF.

External links
Sri Lanka Air Force
Ministry of Defence : Sri Lanka

References

Military awards and decorations of Sri Lanka
Awards established in 1976